John Krehbiel may refer to:
 John Krehbiel Jr., American chief executive and billionaire
 V. John Krehbiel, American ambassador